Narpay District is a district of Samarqand Region in Uzbekistan. The capital lies at the city Oqtosh.

The district consists of one city (Oqtosh), 3 urban-type settlements (Mirbozor, Guliston, Qoʻyi Charxin) and 9 rural communities.

References 

Samarqand Region
Districts of Uzbekistan